Reilley is both a surname and a given name. Notable people with the name include:

Surname:
Charlie Reilley (1856–1904), American baseball player
Duke Reilley (1884–1968), American baseball player
Hugh Reilley (1918–1940), Canadian World War II pilot
Thomas T. Reilley (1883–1940), American football coach

Given name:
Reilley Rankin (born 1979), American golfer

See also
Reilly (disambiguation)
Riley (disambiguation)

English-language surnames